The 2020–21 Pittsburgh Penguins season was the 54th season for the National Hockey League team that was established on June 5, 1967. On December 20, 2020, the league temporarily realigned into four divisions with no conferences due to the COVID-19 pandemic and the ongoing closure of the Canada–United States border. As a result of this realignment, the Penguins would play this season in the East Division and would only play against the other teams in their new division during the regular season and potentially the first two rounds of the playoffs.

On April 29, 2021, the Penguins clinched a playoff berth with a 5–4 overtime win over the Washington Capitals, extending their playoff streak to 15 seasons – the longest active streak among the four North American major leagues (including MLB, the NFL, and the NBA). On May 8, the team clinched the East Division title after defeating the Buffalo Sabres 1-0, for their first division championship since the 2013–14 season. The Penguins were then defeated in the First Round in six games by the New York Islanders. On April 20, 2021, the Penguins barreled through the first two periods en route to a 6-0 lead at the end of the second period. The Devils outscored them 6-1 in the third period, but the Penguins still won, 7-6. The Penguins became the first team in NHL history to be outscored by 5 goals in the third period of a game but still be on the winning end.

Standings

Divisional standings

Schedule and results

Regular season
The regular season schedule was published on December 23, 2020.

|- style="background:#fcf;"
| 1 || January 13 || Pittsburgh || 3–6 || Philadelphia || Jarry || 0 || 0–1–0 || 0
|- style="background:#fcf;"
| 2 || January 15 || Pittsburgh || 2–5 || Philadelphia || Jarry || 0 || 0–2–0 || 0
|- style="background:#cfc;"
| 3 || January 17 || Washington || 3–4  || Pittsburgh || DeSmith || 0 || 1–2–0 || 2
|- style="background:#cfc;"
| 4 || January 19 || Washington || 4–5  || Pittsburgh || DeSmith || 0 || 2–2–0 || 4
|- style="background:#cfc;"
| 5 || January 22 || NY Rangers || 3–4  || Pittsburgh || Jarry || 0 || 3–2–0 || 6
|- style="background:#cfc;"
| 6 || January 24 || NY Rangers || 2–3 || Pittsburgh || Jarry || 0 || 4–2–0 || 8
|- style="background:#ffc;"
| 7 || January 26 || Pittsburgh || 2–3  || Boston || Jarry || 0 || 4–2–1 || 9 
|- style="background:#fcf;"
| 8 || January 28 || Pittsburgh || 1–4 || Boston || Jarry || 0 || 4–3–1 || 9
|- style="background:#cfc;"
| 9 || January 30 || Pittsburgh || 5–4  || NY Rangers || DeSmith || 0 || 5–3–1 || 11
|-

|- style="background:#fcf;"
| 10 || February 1 || Pittsburgh || 1–3 || NY Rangers || DeSmith || 0 || 5–4–1 || 11
|- style="background:#ccc;"
| — || February 2 || New Jersey || – || Pittsburgh || colspan="4"|Postponed due to COVID-19. Rescheduled for March 21.
|- style="background:#ccc;"
| — || February 4 || New Jersey || – || Pittsburgh || colspan="4"|Postponed due to COVID-19. Rescheduled for April 20.
|- style="background:#fcf;"
| 11 || February 6 || Pittsburgh || 3–4 || NY Islanders || Jarry || 0 || 5–5–1 || 11
|- style="background:#cfc;"
| 12 || February 11 || Pittsburgh || 4–3  || NY Islanders || DeSmith || 0 || 6–5–1 || 13 
|- style="background:#cfc;"
| 13 || February 14 || Washington || 3–6 || Pittsburgh || Jarry || 0 || 7–5–1 || 15
|- style="background:#fcf;"
| 14 || February 16 || Washington || 3–1 || Pittsburgh || Jarry || 0 || 7–6–1 || 15
|- style="background:#cfc;"
| 15 || February 18 || NY Islanders || 1–4 || Pittsburgh || Jarry || 0 || 8–6–1 || 17
|- style="background:#cfc;"
| 16 || February 20 || NY Islanders || 2–3 || Pittsburgh || Jarry || 0 || 9–6–1 || 19
|- style="background:#cfc;"
| 17 || February 23 || Pittsburgh || 3–2  || Washington || Jarry || 0 || 10–6–1 || 21
|- style="background:#fcf;"
| 18 || February 25 || Pittsburgh || 2–5 || Washington || Jarry || 0 || 10–7–1 || 21
|- style="background:#cfc;"
| 19 || February 27 || Pittsburgh || 4–3  || NY Islanders || Jarry || 0 || 11–7–1 || 23
|- style="background:#fcf;"
| 20 || February 28 || Pittsburgh || 0–2 || NY Islanders || DeSmith || 0 || 11–8–1 || 23
|-

|- style="background:#cfc;"
| 21 || March 2 || Philadelphia || 2–5 || Pittsburgh || Jarry || 2,800 || 12–8–1 || 25
|- style="background:#fcf;"
| 22 || March 4 || Philadelphia || 4–3 || Pittsburgh || Jarry || 2,800 || 12–9–1 || 25
|- style="background:#cfc;"
| 23 || March 6 || Philadelphia || 3–4 || Pittsburgh || Jarry || 2,800 || 13–9–1 || 27
|- style="background:#cfc;"
| 24 || March 7 || NY Rangers || 1–5 || Pittsburgh || DeSmith || 2,800 || 14–9–1 || 29
|- style="background:#cfc;"
| 25 || March 9 || NY Rangers || 2–4 || Pittsburgh || Jarry || 2,800 || 15–9–1 || 31
|- style="background:#cfc;"
| 26 || March 11 || Pittsburgh || 5–2 || Buffalo || Jarry || 0 || 16–9–1 || 33
|- style="background:#cfc;"
| 27 || March 13 || Pittsburgh || 3–0 || Buffalo || DeSmith || 0 || 17–9–1 || 35
|- style="background:#cfc;"
| 28 || March 15 || Boston || 1–4 || Pittsburgh || Jarry || 2,800 || 18–9–1 || 37
|- style="background:#fcf;"
| 29 || March 16 || Boston || 2–1 || Pittsburgh || DeSmith || 2,800 || 18–10–1 || 37
|- style="background:#fcf;"
| 30 || March 18 || Pittsburgh || 2–3 || New Jersey || Jarry || 1,800 || 18–11–1 || 37
|- style="background:#cfc;"
| 31 || March 20 || Pittsburgh || 3–1 || New Jersey || DeSmith || 1,800 || 19–11–1 || 39
|- style="background:#ffc;"
| 32 || March 21 || New Jersey || 2–1  || Pittsburgh || Jarry || 2,800 || 19–11–2 || 40
|- style="background:#cfc;"
| 33 || March 24 || Buffalo || 2–5 || Pittsburgh || Jarry || 2,800 || 20–11–2 || 42
|- style="background:#cfc;"
| 34 || March 25 || Buffalo || 0–4 || Pittsburgh || DeSmith || 2,800 || 21–11–2 || 44
|- style="background:#cfc;"
| 35 || March 27 || NY Islanders || 3–6 || Pittsburgh || Jarry || 2,800 || 22–11–2 || 46
|- style="background:#cfc;"
| 36 || March 29 || NY Islanders || 1–2 || Pittsburgh || Jarry || 2,800 || 23–11–2 || 48
|-

|- style="background:#cfc;"
| 37 || April 1 || Pittsburgh || 4–1 || Boston || DeSmith || 2,191 || 24–11–2 || 50
|- style="background:#fcf;"
| 38 || April 3 || Pittsburgh || 5–7 || Boston || DeSmith || 2,191 || 24–12–2 || 50
|- style="background:#fcf;"
| 39 || April 6 || Pittsburgh || 4–8 || NY Rangers || DeSmith || 1,693 || 24–13–2 || 50
|- style="background:#cfc;"
| 40 || April 8 || Pittsburgh || 5–2 || NY Rangers || Jarry || 1,800 || 25–13–2 || 52
|- style="background:#cfc;"
| 41 || April 9 || Pittsburgh || 6–4 || New Jersey || DeSmith || 3,600 || 26–13–2 || 54
|- style="background:#cfc;"
| 42 || April 11 || Pittsburgh || 5–2 || New Jersey || Jarry || 3,600 || 27–13–2 || 56
|- style="background:#ffc;"
| 43 || April 15 || Philadelphia || 2–1  || Pittsburgh || Jarry || 4,672 || 27–13–3 || 57
|- style="background:#cfc;"
| 44 || April 17 || Pittsburgh || 3–2 || Buffalo || Jarry || — || 28–13–3 || 59
|- style="background:#fcf;"
| 45 || April 18 || Pittsburgh || 2–4 || Buffalo || DeSmith || 0 || 28–14–3 || 59
|- style="background:#cfc;"
| 46 || April 20 || New Jersey || 6–7 || Pittsburgh || Jarry || 4,672 || 29–14–3 || 61
|- style="background:#cfc;"
| 47 || April 22 || New Jersey || 1–5 || Pittsburgh || Jarry || 4,672 || 30–14–3 || 63
|- style="background:#cfc;"
| 48 || April 24 || New Jersey || 2–4 || Pittsburgh || DeSmith || 4,672 || 31–14–3 || 65
|- style="background:#cfc;"
| 49 || April 25 || Boston || 0–1 || Pittsburgh || Jarry || 4,672 || 32–14–3 || 67
|- style="background:#fcf;"
| 50 || April 27 || Boston || 3–1 || Pittsburgh || Jarry || 4,672 || 32–15–3 || 67
|- style="background:#cfc;"
| 51 || April 29 || Pittsburgh || 5–4  || Washington || Jarry || 2,133 || 33–15–3 || 69
|-

|- style="background:#cfc;"
| 52 || May 1 || Pittsburgh || 3–0 || Washington || Jarry || 2,133 || 34–15–3 || 71
|- style="background:#fcf;"
| 53 || May 3 || Pittsburgh || 2–7 || Philadelphia || DeSmith || 2,542 || 34–16–3 || 71
|- style="background:#cfc;"
| 54 || May 4 || Pittsburgh || 7–3 || Philadelphia || Jarry || 2,961 || 35–16–3 || 73
|- style="background:#cfc;"
| 55 || May 6 || Buffalo || 4–8 || Pittsburgh || Jarry || 4,672 || 36–16–3 || 75
|- style="background:#cfc;"
| 56 || May 8 || Buffalo || 0–1 || Pittsburgh || Lagace || 4,672 || 37–16–3 || 77
|-

|- style="text-align:center;"
| Legend:       = Win       = Loss       = OT/SO Loss       = Postponement

Playoffs

|- style="background:#fcf;"
| 1 || May 16 || NY Islanders || 4–3 || Pittsburgh || OT || Jarry || 4,672 || 0–1 || Recap
|- style="background:#cfc;"
| 2 || May 18 || NY Islanders || 1–2 || Pittsburgh ||  || Jarry || 9,344 || 1–1 || Recap
|- style="background:#cfc;"
| 3 || May 20 || Pittsburgh || 5–4 || NY Islanders ||  || Jarry || 6,800 || 2–1 || Recap
|- style="background:#fcf;"
| 4 || May 22 || Pittsburgh || 1–4 || NY Islanders ||  || Jarry || 6,800 || 2–2 || Recap
|- style="background:#fcf;"
| 5 || May 24 || NY Islanders || 3–2 || Pittsburgh || 2OT || Jarry || 9,344 || 2–3 || Recap
|- style="background:#fcf;"
| 6 || May 26 || Pittsburgh || 3–5 || NY Islanders ||  || Jarry || 9,000 || 2–4 || Recap 
|-

|-
| ''Legend:       = Win       = Loss

Player statistics

Skaters

Goaltenders

†Denotes player spent time with another team before joining the Penguins. Stats reflect time with the Penguins only.
‡Denotes player was traded mid-season. Stats reflect time with the Penguins only.
Bold/italics denotes franchise record.

Transactions
The Penguins have been involved in the following transactions during the 2020–21 season.

Trades

Draft picks

Below are the Pittsburgh Penguins' selections at the 2020 NHL Entry Draft, which was originally scheduled for June 26–27, 2020 at the Bell Center in Montreal, Quebec, but was postponed on March 25, 2020, due to the COVID-19 pandemic. It was instead held on October 6–7, 2020, virtually via video conference call from the NHL Network studio in Secaucus, New Jersey.

Notes

References

Pittsburgh Penguins seasons
Penguins
2020 in sports in Pennsylvania
2021 in sports in Pennsylvania